The Walter C. Beckjord Generating Station was a 1.43-gigawatt (1,433 MW), dual-fuel power generating facility located near New Richmond, Ohio, 22 miles east of Cincinnati, Ohio. The plant began operation in 1952 and was decommissioned in 2014. It was jointly owned by Duke Energy, American Electric Power (AEP), and Dayton Power & Light (DP&L).

Background
Of the two Beckjord power plants, one was coal-fired (Units 1–6) and the other was oil-fired (Units GT1–GT4). It was originally built by Cinergy (originally Cincinnati Gas and Electric Company (CG&E)), which was bought by Duke Energy in 2006.  The plant is named after Walter C. Beckjord, the chairman of CG&E from 1957 to 1962. CG&E installed new electrostatic precipitators at Beckjord in the 1970s to reduce pollution mandated by the State of Ohio.

Closure and decommissioning
In July 2011, Duke Energy announced that Beckjord would shut down in January 2015 because of tightening environmental regulations from the Environmental Protection Agency (EPA) outweighed the benefits of retrofitting the plant.  The shut down was accelerated to November 2014 after an open valve caused an oil spill into the Ohio River the previous August. Duke Energy plead guilty in federal court in 2016 for spilling 9,000 gallons of diesel fuel into the Ohio River. The company was fined $1 million for the spill.

In 2015, Duke Energy installed a battery-based energy storage system at the site for the purpose of regulating frequency in the electric grid. As a part of the decommissioning process, Duke Energy terminated their lease with the New Richmond Soccer Association who played soccer matches adjacent to Beckjord.

Duke Energy and its co-owners, AEP and DP&L, agreed to sell Beckjord and adjacent lands to Commercial Liability Partners for an undisclosed amount in February 2018. Commercial Liability Partners will repurpose the brownfields for redevelopment.

See also

 List of power stations in Ohio

References

Energy infrastructure completed in 1952
Energy infrastructure completed in 1953
Energy infrastructure completed in 1954
Energy infrastructure completed in 1958
Energy infrastructure completed in 1962
Energy infrastructure completed in 1969
Energy infrastructure completed in 1972
Buildings and structures in Clermont County, Ohio
Former coal-fired power stations in Ohio
Former oil-fired power stations in the United States
Duke Energy
American Electric Power
AES Corporation
1952 establishments in Ohio
2014 disestablishments in Ohio